Ali Baba is an Indian fantasy television series based on the Arabian Nights character Ali Baba. Produced by Alind Srivastava and Nissar Parvez under Peninsula Pictures, it formerly starred Sheezan Mohammed Khan, Tunisha Sharma, Karthik Jayaram and Sayantani Ghosh in the first season titled Ali Baba: Dastaan-e-Kabul : Chapter 1 (TRANSLATION : Ali Baba : Legend of Kabul : Chapter 1). It premiered on 22 August 2022 to 14 January 2023 on Sony SAB and digitally streams on SonyLIV. Since 16 January 2023 it stars Abhishek Nigam replacing Khan and Manul Chudasama replacing Tunisha as the leads in the new season titled Ali Baba: Ek Andaaz Andekha : Chapter 2 (TRANSLATION : Ali Baba : A Style Unseen : Chapter 2). The series follows the life of an orphan Alibaba, from the Mamuli Gali of Kabul, and the challenges he faces while he tries to protect and take care of five other orphan children.

Series overview

Plot

Chapter 1: Dastaan-E-Kabul
The story begins with Ali Baba who lives with 5 orphan children Gulrez, Imaad, Poya, Nafi and Alifi in the Mamuli Gali of Kabul. Ali Baba being poor is a very good person at heart who doesn't know about his fate and talent, always receives flashbacks of his childhood in which his father Mustafa; a sorcerer who traps all the 40 thieves in a curse that until the moon is secure in the sky they will be trapped in a stone grave. He also stops their leader Iblis from fulfilling his evil intentions but is killed by Iblis. Mustafa in his final moments he makes a prophecy that Ali will become a greater sorcerer than him and protect the citizens of Kabul and write "Dastaan-E-Kabul". In present time, Simsim who is a devotee of Iblis and loves him truly has sent a meteor towards the moon so that the 40 thieves are freed who will find the 'talisman' that has Iblis's life captured in it. The talisman was divided into two pieces by Mustafa. Ali who holds one part of the talisman is completely unaware of the truth and his destiny. In Kabul's capital Kabulshahi, Sultan Shah Zuhaid is assassinated by his brother-in-law Saddam who is sidekick of Simsim and wants to be the Sultan of Kabul. Sultan's daughter Mariam, the Princess of Kabul, is rescued by her caretaker Daai Jaan and commander-in-chief Dara Gazi. Princess Mariam keeps falling in trouble as she was brought up with a lot of care and far away from the real truth of the world due to which she trusts everyone blindly. The forty thieves are freed as the meteor created by Simsim crashes the moon and causes a crack on it which breaks Mustafa's curse. Soon Mariam escapes Kabul Shahi and on the way she finds the second part of the talisman which connects her with Ali. Ali and Mariam keep crossing each other and finally meet in the jumma bazar where Mariam loses her first part of the talisman. Ali rescues Mariam from the slave traders and are on a run on the way to Hairat escaping from the slave traders. On Zorawar's manipulation Ali's brother Qasim gets ready to oust the kids with his wife so that they can sell their house to Zorawar in exchange of money. As the kids get to know the truth they escape from there and are on a run as well searching for Ali, where they started suspecting Nafi due to his general knowledge and skills and as the remaining four didn't know his past. After acquiring the first part of the talisman that Mariam was holding, Simsim and the 40 thieves are on their heist to find the other part of the talisman that is held by Ali. Finally after a lot of happenings Ali, Mariam and the five children safely return to Ali's house after escaping from the 40 thieves. Slowly after Mariam understands Ali, she starts getting close to him and on the other hand, even Ali starts to recognize her innocence and unawareness about the world and starts falling for her. Though unaware of their destiny, both of them starts working to achieve their individual goals, ultimately coming more closer to each other. Soon, Ali gets to know about his past and is successful in acquiring the second part of the talisman and becomes the rakhwala of Parwaz but tragedy strikes Ali's house after his step brother Qasim gets to know about him being rakhwala. He enters Simsim's cave and is brutally murdered by Simsim and 40 thieves. The 40 thieves threaten the people after hanging Qasim at the city centre of Parwaz stating that if someone tried to take away Qasim's body for burial would be killed by them along with his family, they do this in the hope that they would be able to catch the rakhwala.Ali aka Rakhwala is successful in providing Qasim a burial without coming in the sight of the forty thieves. Ali enters a magical world created by his father Mustafa to find a solution to kill the forty thieves whereas on the other hand Simsim is on the way to free herself from the curse that had enclosed her in the cave as even a ray of sun could burn and kill her which would require confining a pious soul of Mariam alias Marjina. Saddam successfully captures Mariam and presents her in front of the forty thieves for freeing Simsim. Ali obtains the Noor that could end the forty thieves that is none other than his own father but is informed that the Noor would only work when it is used along with the talisman Ali had left at home since no magic could be taken along in the magic world. Ali returns to Parwaz but finds that his talisman is lost along with Marjina's kidnapping about which Nafi informs him as Nafi tried to save Marjina from Saddam but was unsuccessful in it. Without the talisman's power, Ali goes in search of Marjina where he tries to save her from the forty thieves. Simsim is freed from her cure and enters Parwaz in search of the Rakhwala (Jadugar).Simsim enters Parwaz disguised as Simijaan and searches for the Jadugar and in order to find him she takes the form of Saaya and turns the people of Parwaz into wooden dolls.Poya who is aware of the truth of Ali being the Rakhwala reveals this truth to Alifi and Nafi whereas Nafi identifies Marjina's truth that she is none other than Mariam, Princess of Kabul.Simsim with the identity of Simijaan resides in Ali's house and captures Noora dadi.

Chapter 2: Ek Andaaz Andekha
In order to reach till the Jadugar, Simsim enters Mustafa's magical world and is informed by Mustafa that the Jadugar is none other than his son Ali Baba. During this period, Alifi saves Noora dadi as she gets to know that Simsim is an evil mistress and also burns the gate to Mustafa's magical realm whereas Mustafa destroys his realm to kill Simsim but is unsuccessful as Simsim escapes and returns to Parwaz and is on the search to find Ali. Ali burns his face in the attempt of saving Marjina and gets a new face through ancient cosmetic surgery and he returns to fulfill his motive as well as finding Marjina. Ali also finishes Bala who is a serpent and obtains the jewel on her forehead in order to cure the people of Parwaz and save them from Saaya's clutches. Ali returns as Chhote Kotwal and claims to his kids that Ali is dead, but Alifi figures out that Kotwal is none other than Ali Baba himself but doesn't reveal this to anyone. Ali teams with SimmiJaan and finally finds Marjina, but is shocked to see that Marjina doesn't remember him anymore. He finds out that Simsim had cleaned her memory so that a Beast, who is the prince of Ras Al Khaimah could marry her and their children could become beasts and that latter Ras al khaimah could be full of beasts.

Cast

Main
 Sheezan Mohammed Khan as Ali Baba, Mustafa and Roshni's son, caretaker of five orphan children, Mariam's love-interest. (2022) 
 Abhishek Nigam replaced Sheezan as Ali Baba (2023–present)
 Subhan Khan as young Ali Baba (2022) 
 Tunisha Sharma as Shehzaadi Mariam, Princess of Kabul, Ali's love-interest, Sultan Shah Zuhaid's daughter. She is known as Marjina (fake identity) by Ali, his five orphan children and his friends. (2022)
Manul Chudasama replaced Tunisha as Shehzadi Mariam aka Marjina (2023–present)
 Karthik Jayaram as Iblis, devotee of Iblis and named after him, leader of 40 thieves, Simsim's love interest and a dreadful and deadly warrior. (Cameo appearance) (2022)
 Sayantani Ghosh as Simsim/Simi Jaan, devotee of Iblis. Later blessed with power and cursed to become guardian of the cave. Iblis love interest. (2022–present)

Recurring
 Arisht Jain as Imaad Abdali, An intelligent so-called orphan raised by Ali. He is later revealed to be Ziya Abdali's biological second son and Zoravar's younger half-brother whom he abandoned in Ali's house years ago.
 Sara Paintal as Gulrez, A youngest of all the orphans raised by Ali.
 Ekagra Dwivedi as Poya, A foodie orphan raised by Ali.
 Jared Savaille as Nafi Afghani, A chilled and open-minded so-called orphan raised by Ali. He is later revealed to be the son of Theeyab Afghani who is the Chief of Nakabjani Tribe and is raised by the family of thieves. This truth is only known to Poya who is another orphan kid being raised by Ali. He is the first person to know about Marjina's real identity.
 Ananya Dwivedi as Alifi, A kind and eldest of all the orphans raised by Ali. She is the first person and only child to know about Ali's new identity.
 Naved Aslam as Mustafa, Qasim and Ali Baba's father and a great sorcerer who was killed by Iblis.
 Daljeet Soundh as Noora Bibi, Mustafa's mother, Qasim and Ali Baba's paternal grandmother who locked herself in her room for 20 years and came out of the room when the moon broke.
 Vineet Raina as Qasim, Mustafa's son from first wife and Ali Baba's elder half-brother. He was killed by Simsim and the forty thieves.
 Sapna Thakur as Nazia, Qasim's widow, Ali Baba's half-sister-in-law
 Ayush Shrivastava as Khusro/Kishore, Ali baba's best friend who hails from Hindustan.
 Hunza Sabir as Zarifa, Dariba's sister, Ali baba's friend
 Parth Zutshi Sarin as Dariba, Zarifa's brother, Ali baba's friend
 Akshay Anand as Sultan Shah Zuhaid, Kind Emperor of Kabul and Mariam's father who was assassinated by his own brother-in-law, Saddam.
 Farida Dadi as Zoya, Mariam's caretaker who was killed by Majhud.
 Mukul Nag as Dara Gazi Princess Mariam protector
 Karan Pahwa as Jahangir 
 Kaushik Chakravorty as Monk
 Chandan Anand as Saddam, Mariam's wicked maternal uncle who became the Emperor of Kabul with Simsim's help.
 Soneer Vadhera as Majhud, A general of Kabul's army and Saddam's sidekick, killed by Dara Gazi, Yajhud's twin brother, sidekick and new Commander-in-chief of Kabul under Saddam's rule.
 Mohit Abrol as Zoravar Abdali, Shahi Sarrak's chief Zia Abdali's son, Imaad's elder half-brother, Ali Baba's rival. He was killed by the snake monster named Fakri sent by the Simsim and the 40 thieves.
 Zahid Ali as Ziya Abdali, Shahi Sarrak's chief, Zoravar and Imaad's father.
 Khushbu Tiwari as Fathima, Afrasia's daughter, Ali Baba's love-interest.
 Navina Bole as Afrasiya, Fatima's mother.
 Ravi Gossain as Usmaan, A low ranked general in Kabul's army whom Ali Baba tricked by disguising as Iblis.
 Rajdeep Singh Kharoud as Haider
 Athar Siddiqui as Dajjal, He was killed by Ali Baba.
 Gaurav Walia as Ifrit, second-in-command of forty thieves and the most powerful thief after Iblis.
 Raviz Thakur as Khafees, one of the forty thieves and Iblis' one of the favourites.
 Kailash Topnani as Ghoul, one of the forty thieves and Iblis' one of the favourites.
 Ritvik Bhargava as Aazim
 Rumi Khan as Aamir Rehmani
 Behzaad Khan as Behzaak, who capture for slavery.
 Anshul Bammi as Shahmed, Prince of Herat and Saddam's sidekick.
 Saanvi Talwar as Humaira
 Aradhana Sharma as Rumana
 Ram Yashvardhan as Shehzada of Ras Al Khaimah
 Alisha Tunga as Rukhsar, Marjina's friend from Ras Al Khaimah 
 Vaibhavi Mahajan as Gul, Marjina's friend who was killed by the Shehzada (Haiwan) of Ras Al Khaimah

Production

Casting
Sheezan Mohammed Khan was cast in the titular role, and was joined by Tunisha Sharma, Karthik Jayaram and Sayantani Ghosh as leads.

Navina Bole was cast to portray Fatima's mother in October 2022.

Abhishek Nigam replaced Sheezan Mohammed Khan in Season 2 in January 2023 post Sharma's demise while Manul Chudasama replaced Tunisha as Mariam in the following month.

Controversy
On 24 December 2022, actress Tunisha Sharma playing the lead role of Shehzaadi Mariam, committed suicide by hanging herself in the green room of co-star Sheezan Mohammed Khan on set. She was taken to a nearby hospital where she was declared dead on arrival.

Hours after her death her co-actor, rumored boyfriend and the lead Sheezan Mohammed Khan was booked in the case of abetment for suicide by her mother.

On 4 January 2023, Federation of Western India Cine Employees, president BN Tiwari demanded strict action against the makers for negligence.

Development
The series was announced by Peninsula Pictures in March 2022 and was confirmed in July 2022 by Sony SAB. The shooting of the series began in June 2022 in Ladakh, India.

Filming
The shooting of the series halted after the lead actress Tunisha Sharma committed suicide on set in Naigaon. The show had an episode bank of one week.

The cast resumed the shooting of the series on January 4, 2023, on Renu Studio in Naigaon. Actor Abhishek Nigam was finalized to replace Sheezan Khan as Ali Baba in a new plot.

Soundtrack

Ali Baba soundtrack is composed by Souvyk Chakraborty. The first song "Rehnuma" is the theme song of Ali and Mariam.

See also 
 List of programmes broadcast by Sony SAB

References

External links
 
 Alibaba - Dastaan-e-Kabul on SonyLIV
 Ali Baba Dastaan – E – Kabul on Sony SAB

2022 Indian television series debuts
2020s Indian television series
Indian television sitcoms
Hindi-language television shows
Indian fantasy television series
Sony SAB original programming